This is the discography of American rock musician Matt Nathanson.

Studio albums

Live albums

Extended plays

Singles

References 

Discographies of American artists
Rock music discographies